The National Coalition for Men (NCFM), formerly the National Coalition of Free Men, is a non-profit educational and civil rights organization which aims to address the ways sex discrimination affects men and boys. The organization has sponsored conferences, adult education, demonstrations and lawsuits.  NCFM is the United States' oldest generalist men's rights organization. It professes to being politically neutral, neither conservative nor liberal.

Foundation
Free Men, Inc. was founded in Columbia, Maryland in January 1977. The name "Free Men" was used as an imperative (as in Free Men from unfair divorce laws). By-laws were formally adopted in July. The four founding members were: Richard Haddad, Dennis Gilbert, Allan Scheib and Allen Foreman. Richard Haddad authored the "Free Men Philosophy" which included 26 items from which he felt men should be freed. These represented options. The first newsletter was named "Options".

This early chapter concentrated on forming "support groups" for men as counterparts to "consciousness raising groups" tailored to women.

Initial national interest resulted from appearances by author Herb Goldberg, author of The Hazards of Being Male. By 1980, the Free Men. Inc. organization in Columbia had begun to disintegrate. Nevertheless, undaunted by local circumstance in Columbia, others in different parts of the country began forming groups associated with the Maryland organization. Two new groups formed chapters in Boston, Massachusetts (Headed by Frederic Hayward, founder of Men's Rights, Inc. A strong supporter was Robert A. Sides who went on to represent NCFM on national television and radio talk shows) and Nassau County, New York. The strongest of the two was in Nassau County. As a result, it received all of Free Men, Inc.'s records as it became clear that the Maryland group was going to fold.

History

The Nassau County Chapter was formed in early 1980. In February 1981 the Nassau County, New York chapter began its own newsletter called "Transitions." By October 1981 the chapter had been responsible for inspiring and forming other groups in Suffolk County, New York and New Milford, Connecticut.

On Saturday, October 24, 1981 the Nassau County chapter produced its first conference. It was funded by Adelphi University and was called "Freeing Men From The Macho Mold: Options For Men In The 1980s."  The conference was followed up the next day by Free Men's first convention, which was attended by representatives from various groups. Transitions became the national newsletter.

Out of the convention was born the "Coalition." Tom Williamson and Naomi Penner organized the convention, organized the national body and are credited with founding the "Coalition." Tom Williamson was elected President and Naomi Penner was elected Vice President.

Incorporation proceedings were begun and the coalition became official in December 1981. The incorporation was amended in 1982 to further clarify objectives. The original intent was for the governing body to be called, "Free Men." However, after the organization was informed that someone else in New York owned that name the organization considered such words as "Union" and "Association" before settling on "Coalition." The governing body was formally incorporated as "The Coalition of Free Men, Inc."

As of 2006, the National Coalition of Free Men had 5 chapters from California to New York. In the spring of 2008, the organization changed its name to the National Coalition for Men.

NCFM championed the case of William Hetherington until his parole in 2009.

The NCFM supported a Republican version of the Violence Against Women Act in 2012. The organization argued that the bill written by Senate Democrats excluded heterosexual men and would empower "false accusers at the expense of true victims",
and encouraged women present in the country without legal documents to make false accusations of abuse in order to stay in the country.
The liberal Center for American Progress has criticized the NCFM for its stance on the issue, as did the Southern Poverty Law Center.

The NCFM has engaged in controversial behavior such as publicly outing alleged sexual assault victims whose cases were dismissed due to lack of evidence and labelling these women as "false accusers".

In July 2020, NCFM's vice president and main attorney in several lawsuits, Marc Angelucci, was murdered at his home.

Achievements

In 2005 the NCFM filed a lawsuit against the state of California for funding domestic violence shelters for women only. In 2008 the Court of Appeal ruled in their favor and held that the exclusion of male victims violates men's rights to equal protection and "carries with it the baggage of sexual stereotypes", because "men experience significant levels of domestic violence as victims" 

The NCFM filed a lawsuit, National Coalition for Men v. Selective Service System, that challenges the legality of requiring only males to register for the military draft.  The lawsuit was filed against the U.S. Selective Service System in the United States District Court for the Central District of California on April 4, 2013. In 2016, the U.S. Court of Appeals for the Ninth Circuit reversed the district court's dismissal of the case and remanded the case back to the district court. The case was later moved to the United States District Court for the Southern District of Texas in the 5th Circuit. On February 22, 2019 Judge Gray H. Miller issued a declaratory judgement that the male-only registration requirement is unconstitutional. In 2021, the American Civil Liberties Union filed a petition for a writ of certiorari to the Supreme Court on behalf of the National Coalition of Men. In June of that year, the Supreme Court denied the writ, with Justice Sotomayor citing "the Court's longstanding deference to Congress on matters of national defense and military affairs," especially while Congress was in the process of assessing the need for male-only drafts.

Criticism

The Southern Poverty Law Center has criticized the group as doing more to blame women and lobby against laws that supposedly protect women from discrimination and violence, than to advance equal treatment of men. SPLC accuses NCM of cherry-picking statistics and creating false equivalences in the oppression of men and women.

References

External links
 National Coalition for Men - NCFM.org

Men's rights organizations
Men's organizations in the United States
Non-profit organizations based in San Diego
Organizations established in 1977
1977 establishments in Maryland